Crocyleium or Krokyleion was a town in Aetolia Epictetus, on the borders of Locris, and one day's march from Potidania.

Its site is tentatively located near the modern Filothei.

References

Populated places in ancient Aetolia
Former populated places in Greece